Serenade for Two Spies (German: Serenade für zwei Spione, Italian: Sinfonia per due spie) is a 1965 West German-Italian spy film directed by Michael Pfleghar.

Cast
Hellmut Lange as John Krim
Tony Kendall as Pepino
Barbara Lass as Tamara
Heidelinde Weis as Goldfeather
Wolfgang Neuss as Secret Service Chief
Mimmo Palmara as Cormoran (as Dick Palmer)
Annie Giss

External links
 
 Serenade for Two Spies at Variety Distribution

1965 films
West German films
German parody films
German spy comedy films
Italian parody films
Italian spy comedy films
1960s parody films
1960s spy comedy films
Films set in the United States
1960s German-language films
Parody films based on James Bond films
1965 comedy films
Films directed by Michael Pfleghar
1960s Italian films
1960s German films